Renfrew/Black Donald Lake Water Aerodrome  is a water based aerodrome that is located on Black Donald Lake in Greater Madawaska, Renfrew County, Ontario, Canada, about  south southwest of the town of Renfrew.

See also
 Renfrew/Hurds Lake Water Aerodrome

References

Registered aerodromes in Ontario
Transport in Renfrew County
Seaplane bases in Ontario